Mosman Park is a western suburb of Perth, Western Australia on the north bank of the Swan River in the local government area of the Town of Mosman Park. It was historically known as Buckland Hill (1889–1909), then Cottesloe Beach (1909–1930) and again Buckland Hill (1930–1937). From 1937 it was named Mosman Park, derived from Mosman in Sydney, the birthplace of Richard Yeldon, a member of the Buckland Hill Road Board. Mosman Park is now considered an affluent suburb, but prior to the 1970s was one of Perth's major industrial centres.

Geography
Mosman Park is bounded by the Indian Ocean and the Fremantle railway line to the west, a line south of Johnston Street to the north, and the Swan River to the east and south with approximately 5 km of river frontage. To the west of the railway line Mosman Park includes a section of approximately 600 metres of ocean frontage, south of the extension of Boundary Road and north of the extension of McCabe Street.

History
Following the 1827 expedition by Captain James Stirling on HMS Success to assess the suitability of the Swan River district for a settlement, it was the original plan for the 1829 expedition to use the area around Buckland Hill as the site for a town for the proposed settlement. The expedition's botanist Charles Fraser wrote "These hills are admirably adapted for the site of a town, their elevated situation commanding a view of the whole of Canning Sound, with the adjacent coast, the interior for some distance, and the meanderings of the river. Their lying open to all breezes, too, is an additional advantage."

Mosman Park was established with the first survey of town lots in 1889 as Buckland Hill, taking its name from the prominent local hill that was a major maritime navigation mark for shipping from the earliest days of colonization.

Mosman Park was a major industrial centre for the state with a General Motors car and truck assembly plant (1926–1972), the Colonial Sugar Refinery, the Mt Lyell Farmers' Fertilisers superphosphate works, the  W.A. Rope and Twine Works and the West Australian Brushware Co. factory (one of the largest of its kind in Australia). All were closed by the 1970s. Today, almost all of Mosman Park is residential, with significant parklands at Buckland Hill and along the river.

The ABS identified health, hospitality and education as the main occupations of residents.

In 2009, a riverside mansion in Mosman Park was sold for $57.5 million (equivalent to $ million in ), setting a new Australian property record. The house was bought by mining entrepreneur Chris Ellison from mining heiress Angela Bennett.

Transport
Mosman Park is served by the Mosman Park and Victoria Street railway stations. Various public buses, including the CircleRoute bus route travel along Stirling Highway and through Mosman Park's eastern section.

Politics
From 1901 to 1968 and from 1974 to 1980 Mosman Park was part of the Fremantle electorate, since 1934 a notional Labor seat. Its most prominent member was wartime Prime Minister John Curtin, a Cottesloe resident.

Since 1980 it has been part of the federal division of Curtin. Curtin has historically been regarded as a safe seat for the centre-right Liberal Party, which held the seat mostly continually since its inception. However, the seat was won by the independent Kate Chaney at the 2022 federal election. In the parliament of Western Australia, its Legislative Assembly electoral district is Cottesloe, held by David Honey, also of the Liberal Party.

Notable residents
 Angela Bennett, mining heiress and businesswoman 
 Lang Hancock (1909–1992), iron ore mining developer
 Harriet Hooton (1875–1960), women's activist and editor
 John Hughes, businessman
 Rose Porteous, widow of Lang Hancock
 Ralph Sarich, orbital engine and orbital combustion process inventor
 Sir Albert Wolff (1899–1977), chief justice and lieutenant-governor of Western Australia

References

External links

 Town of Mosman Park Website

 
Suburbs of Perth, Western Australia
Town of Mosman Park